Dana Robins Ivey is an American actress. She is a five-time Tony Award nominee for her work on Broadway, and won the 1997 Drama Desk Award for Outstanding Featured Actress in a Play for her work in both Sex and Longing and The Last Night of Ballyhoo. Her film appearances include The Color Purple (1985), Dirty Rotten Scoundrels (1988), The Addams Family (1991), Home Alone 2: Lost in New York (1992), Sleepless in Seattle (1993), Addams Family Values (1993), Two Weeks Notice (2002), Rush Hour 3 (2007), and The Help (2011).

Early life and family
Ivey was born in Atlanta, Georgia. Her mother, Mary Nell Ivey Santacroce (née McKoin), was a teacher, speech therapist, and actress who appeared in productions of Driving Miss Daisy and taught at Georgia State University; Mary Nell was considered by John Huston to be "one of the three or four greatest actresses in the world." Her father, Hugh Daugherty Ivey, was a physicist and professor who taught at Georgia Tech and later worked at the Atomic Energy Commission. Her parents later divorced. She has a younger brother, John, and a half-brother, Eric Santacroce, and one nephew, Evan Santacroce from her mother's remarriage to Dante Santacroce.

She received her undergraduate degree at Rollins College in Winter Park, Florida. She was a member of Phi Mu women's fraternity and earned a Fulbright grant to study drama at the London Academy of Music and Dramatic Art. She received an honorary doctorate (humane letters) from Rollins College in February 2008.

Career

Stage
Before making New York City her home in the late 1970s, Ivey appeared in numerous American and Canadian stage productions and served as director of DramaTech in Atlanta from 1974 to 1977, as had her mother before her from 1949 to 1966. In 1981, Ivey made her Broadway debut playing two small roles in a production of Macbeth; the following year, she was cast in a major supporting role in a revival of Noël Coward's Present Laughter, for which she received the Clarence Derwent Award as Outstanding Featured Actress in a Play. She was nominated for two Tony Awards in the same season (1984) – as Best Featured Actress in a Musical for Stephen Sondheim's Sunday in the Park with George and Best Featured Actress in a Play for a revival of Heartbreak House – a feat repeated by only three other actresses, Amanda Plummer, Jan Maxwell, and Kate Burton.

Ivey's performances in Quartermaine's Terms and Driving Miss Daisy (creating the title role) earned her Obie Awards, as did that in Mrs. Warren's Profession (2005).

Ivey performed in the New York premiere in 2009 of The Savannah Disputation by Evan Smith at Playwrights Horizons. The comedy co-starred Marylouise Burke, Reed Birney, and Kellie Overbey.

In July 2010, she appeared as Winnie in Happy Days by Samuel Beckett at the Westport Playhouse. She appeared as Miss Prism in the Roundabout Theatre Company Broadway production of The Importance of Being Earnest in 2011. Ivey played Mrs Candour in the 2016 production of The School for Scandal at the Lucille Lortel Theatre.

In December 2016, Ivey was invited by the Noël Coward Society to lay flowers on the statue of Sir Noël Coward at the Gershwin Theatre in Manhattan to celebrate the 117th birthday of "The Master".

Film
Ivey's first film appearance was in Joe Dante's 1985 science-fiction fantasy film Explorers with Ethan Hawke and River Phoenix. Her first major screen appearance was in Steven Spielberg's adaptation of Alice Walker's The Color Purple later that same year. Among her other film credits are Dirty Rotten Scoundrels, the 1995 remake of Sabrina, Simon Birch, Postcards from the Edge, Home Alone 2: Lost in New York, The Addams Family,Sleepless in Seattle, Addams Family Values, Legally Blonde 2: Red, White and Blonde, The Adventures of Huck Finn, Orange County, Rush Hour 3, The Leisure Seeker, The Importance of Being Earnest, and as Sandra Bullock's character's mother, Mrs. Kelson, in Two Weeks Notice. In 2011, she played the role of Grace Higginbotham in the critically acclaimed film, The Help, and starred in Muhammad Ali's Greatest Fight.

Television
In 1978, Ivey made her television debut in the daytime soap opera Search for Tomorrow. Her television credits include a starring role in the sitcom Easy Street opposite Loni Anderson and guest appearances on Homicide: Life on the Street, Law & Order, Frasier, Oz, The Practice, Sex and the City, Ugly Betty, Boardwalk Empire, and Monk (episode "Mr. Monk and the Other Detective").

Filmography

Film

Television

Broadway credits
 Macbeth (1981)
 Present Laughter (1983)
 Heartbreak House (1984)
 Sunday in the Park with George (1984)
 Pack of Lies (1985)
 The Marriage of Figaro (1985)
 Indiscretions (1995)
 Sex and Longing (1996)
 The Last Night of Ballyhoo (1997)
Waiting in the Wings (1999/2000)
 Major Barbara (2001)
 Henry IV (2003)
 A Day in the Death of Joe Egg (2003)
The Rivals  (2005)
 Butley (2006)
 The Importance of Being Earnest (2011)

Theatre awards and nominations
 1983 Drama Desk Award Outstanding Featured Actress in a Play (Quartermaine's Terms, nominee)
 1983 Drama Desk Award for Outstanding Featured Actress in a Play (Present Laughter, nominee)
 1984 Tony Award for Best Featured Actress in a Musical (Sunday in the Park with George, nominee)
 1984 Tony Award for Best Featured Actress in a Play (Heartbreak House, nominee)
 1987 Drama Desk Award for Outstanding Actress in a Play (Driving Miss Daisy, nominee)
 1997 Tony Award for Best Featured Actress in a Play (The Last Night of Ballyhoo, nominee)
 1997 Drama Desk Award for Outstanding Featured Actress in a Play (The Last Night of Ballyhoo and Sex and Longing, winner)
 2005 Tony Award for Best Featured Actress in a Play (The Rivals, nominee)
 2007 Tony Award for Best Featured Actress in a Play (Butley, nominee)
 2008 Induction into the American Theater Hall of Fame

References

External links
 
 
 
Playwrights Horizons

Living people
Alumni of the London Academy of Music and Dramatic Art
American film actresses
American stage actresses
American television actresses
Drama Desk Award winners
Obie Award recipients
Actresses from Atlanta
Rollins College alumni
20th-century American actresses
21st-century American actresses
Year of birth missing (living people)